Uncial 0259 (in the Gregory-Aland numbering), is a Greek uncial manuscript of the New Testament. Paleographically it has been assigned to the 7th century. The codex contains some parts of the 1 Timothy 1:4-5.6-7, on 2 parchment leaves (12 cm by 10 cm). Written in one column per page, 11 lines per page, in uncial letters.

Text 

 [transcribed by Kurt Treu]

According to Elliott Treu wrongly deciphered reading οικονομιαν, according to him the manuscript reads οικοδομη. 

The nomina sacra contracted. It has two singular readings: 
 εξετραπτησαν instead of εξετραπησαν
 νοσουντης instead of νοουντης.

The text-type of this codex is mixed. Aland placed it in Category III.

History 

Currently it is dated by the INTF to the 7th century.

Currently the codex is housed at the Berlin State Museums (P. 3605) in Berlin.

See also 

 List of New Testament uncials
 Textual criticism
 Uncial 0262

References

Further reading 

 Peter Head, Two Parchments Witnessing First Timothy 1 (2007)
 G. H. R. Horseley, "New Documents Illustrating Early Christianity" 2 (Macquarie University, 1982), pp. 125-140. 
 Elliott, J.K., The Greek Text of the Epistles to Timothy and Titus. (Studies and Documents 26). Salt Lake City: University of Utah Press, 1968. p. 19.
 Kurt Treu, "Neue Neutestamentliche Fragmente der Berliner Papyrussammlung", APF 18 (Berlin: 1966), pp. 23-38. 

Greek New Testament uncials
7th-century biblical manuscripts